Madame Butterfly is a 1995 musical film written and directed by Frédéric Mitterrand and produced by Daniel Toscan du Plantier and Pierre-Olivier Bardet. It is based on the opera Madama Butterfly with music by Giacomo Puccini and libretto by Luigi Illica and Giuseppe Giacosa. Soprano Ying Huang, tenor Richard Troxell, mezzo-soprano Ning Liang, and bass-baritone Richard Cowan star in the film, in addition to singing their roles. The score was adapted, arranged, and conducted by James Conlon.

The film was an international co-production, with the involvement of France 3, Canal+, the British Broadcasting Corporation, Zweites Deutsches Fernsehen, Sianel Pedwar Cymru, France Telecom, and Centre national du cinéma et de l'image animée.

The film was released by Les Films du Losange in France on 22 November 1995 and by Sony Pictures Classics in the United States on 23 May 1996. It received positive reviews, and won the César Award for Best Production Design.

Plot 
See: Madama Butterfly plot synopsis

Cast

References 

1995 films
1990s musical films
French musical films
British musical films
German musical films
Films based on operas by Giacomo Puccini
Films set in Japan
Films set in Nagasaki
Films set in 1904
Films set in 1907
Opera films
1990s British films
1990s French films
1990s German films